Yaylım is a village in the Tercan District, Erzincan Province, Turkey. The village is populated by Kurds of the Çarekan tribe and had a population of 174 in 2021.

The hamlets of Aşağıpardı, Aşağıyaycım, Dere, Direkli, Gökçe, Göllüce, Güzyurdu, Kavak, Kot, Mezra, Oymataş, Saygılı and Taşburun are attached to the village.

References 

Villages in Tercan District
Kurdish settlements in Erzincan Province